The Knifegrinder or Principle of Glittering, also called The Knifegrinder (The Glittering Edge) and sometimes shortened to simply The Knifegrinder, is a 1912-13 cubo-futurist painting by the artist Kazimir Malevich, hence the fragmentation of form associated with futurism as well as the abstract geometry related to cubism. , it is in the collection of the Yale University Art Gallery in New Haven, Connecticut.

History

Very little documentation of the work exists, but it is known that it was painted circa 1912–1913, during the artist's Cubo-Futurist phase.

In 1941, it was given to the Yale University Art Gallery by the Collection Société Anonyme.

Description
The artwork is typical of Malevich's other paintings, in that the subject matter is of a person generally overlooked by society.

The painting depicts a moustached man in a suit and hat manually grinding a knife on a knife sharpener, or a grinding wheel. The human is in a constant state of movement; the person is either repeatedly inspecting his progress on the knife, and, dismayed by the fact that it is not yet sharp enough, once more starts busily peddling the machine, is simply applying the blade to the machine in a fragmentary way, as though he were a novice, or is only shown carefully putting the blade to the sharpener in slow motion. Shavings of metal are suggested by chunks of green around the grinder's face and hands. Behind him on the left are some vases atop shelves and a table and possibly one or two metal pipes, whilst on the right are unclear grey objects (possibly buildings), implying that the person is a professional knife grinder in their workshop; a small staircase may also be observed at the bottom right corner.

The colours blue, green and silver are dominant in the painting; other colours used are orange, yellow, brown and crimson. The metallic palette was probably chosen to emphasise the violent manner in which the shavings and knife glitter.

References

1912 paintings
1913 paintings
Paintings by Kazimir Malevich
Paintings in the Yale University Art Gallery